The People's Assembly of North Korea was the unicameral legislature of the People's Committee of North Korea. It consisted of 237 deputies elected during a meeting of the provincial, city and county people's committees, political parties and social organizations of North Korea held from 17-20 February 1947. 

It held its first session on 21-22 February 1947 and held its last session on 9-10 July 1948 after which it was replaced by the Supreme People's Assembly of the newly-created Democratic People's Republic of Korea.

History 
On 13 November 1946, the Provisional People's Committee of North Korea held elections for the provincial, city and county people's committees, which were the first elections held in North Korea.

On 17-20 February 1947, representatives from the provincial, city and county people's committees in North Korea, along with representatives from political parties and social organizations, held a meeting to organize the People's Assembly of North Korea by electing 237 deputies. 

The People's Assembly of North Korea held its first session on 21-22 February 1947, which organized the People's Committee of North Korea with Kim Il-sung as chairman. 

The People's Assembly would go on to have an additional four regular sessions and one extraordinary session. It mostly worked on preparations for the establishment of the Democratic People's Republic of Korea. 

Its fifth and last regular session was held on 9-10 July 1948, which led to the implementation of the Constitution of the Democratic People's Republic of Korea and the decision to hold elections for the Supreme People's Assembly on 25 August 1948.

Election and membership 
The People's Assembly of North Korea was elected through an indirect election by representatives from the provincial, city and county people's committees, political parties and social organizations across North Korea in a meeting held on 17-20 February 1947.

There were 1,159 representatives who attended the meeting.  The representatives of the people's committees at all levels in the meeting were chosen on the basis of one representative per three people's committee deputies. Each political party and social organization sent five representatives to the meeting. 

The representatives of the meeting then elected a committee that would screen the nominations for candidacy in the People's Assembly. It was a 15-member committee consisting of Kim Il-sung (as chairman of the Pyongyang people's committee), six chairmen of the provincial people's committee, three political party representatives and four social organization representatives.  This committee then chose 237 candidates on the basis of 1 candidate per five meeting representatives.  The 237 candidates were then elected by all representatives present at the meeting.

The 237 elected deputies of the People's Assembly consisted of 86 deputies from the Workers' Party of North Korea, 30 deputies from the Korean Democratic Party, 30 deputies from the Chondoist Chongu Party, and 91 independent deputies. 

Among the 237 elected People's Assembly deputies were 52 workers, 62 peasants, 56 office clerks, 36 intellectuals, 7 businessmen, 10 traders, 4 craftsmen, and 10 religious people.

Powers 
The People's Assembly of North Korea exercised legislative powers and was the highest state power institution of the People's Committee of North Korea. It exercised the following powers during its existence:

 Elect the chairman of the People's Committee of North Korea.
 Elect the head of the Supreme Court.
 Elect the head of the Supreme Prosecutors Office.
 Decide on foreign trade.
 Protect national security.
 Adopt the people's economic plan.
 Approve the state budget.
 Create and change administrative areas.
 Release decisions on implementing amnesties.

When the People's Assembly of North Korea is on recess, its powers are exercised on its behalf by the Standing Committee of the People's Assembly of North Korea.

Sessions 
The People's Assembly of North Korea met in regular session once every three months. A total of five regular sessions and one extraordinary session were held during the existence of the assembly.

References 

Korea, North
Korea, North
North Korea